The following outline is provided as an overview of and topical guide to Svalbard:

Svalbard – incorporated territory of the Kingdom of Norway comprising the Svalbard Archipelago in the Arctic Ocean about midway between mainland Norway and the North Pole.  The archipelago extends from 74° to 81° North, and from 10° to 35° East. The archipelago is the northernmost part of Norway. Three islands are populated: Spitsbergen, Bear Island and Hopen. The capital and largest settlement is Longyearbyen on Spitsbergen.  The Spitsbergen Treaty recognises Norwegian sovereignty over Svalbard and the 1925 Svalbard Act makes Svalbard a full part of the Norwegian Kingdom.

General reference 

 Pronunciation:  , 
 Common English country name:  Svalbard
 Official English country name:  Svalbard of the Kingdom of Norway
 Common endonym(s):  
 Official endonym(s):  
 Adjectival(s):
 Demonym(s):
 Etymology: Name of Svalbard
 ISO country codes for Svalbard and Jan Mayen:  SJ, SJM, 744
 ISO region codes for Svalbard and Jan Mayen:  See ISO 3166-2:SJ
 Internet country code top-level domain for Norway:  .no

Geography of Svalbard 

Geography of Svalbard
 Svalbard is: an archipelago and area of limited sovereignty of Norway
 Location:
 Northern Hemisphere and Eastern Hemisphere
 Europe
 Northern Europe
 Arctic Ocean
 Time zone:  Central European Time (UTC+01), Central European Summer Time (UTC+02)
 Extreme points of Svalbard
 High:  Newtontoppen 
 Low:  Arctic Ocean 0 m
 Land boundaries:  none
 Coastline:  3,587 km
 Population of Svalbard:

 Area of Svalbard: 61,022 km2
 Atlas of Svalbard

Environment of Svalbard 

Environment of Svalbard
 Climate of Svalbard
 Wildlife of Svalbard
 Flora of Svalbard
 World Heritage Sites in Svalbard: None

Demography of Svalbard 

Demographics of Svalbard

Government and politics of Svalbard 

Politics of Svalbard
 Form of government:
 Capital of Svalbard: Longyearbyen
 Elections in Svalbard
 Political parties in Svalbard

Branches of the government of Svalbard 

Government of Svalbard

Government of Svalbard 
 Governor of Svalbard: Kjerstin Askholt
 Longyearbyen Community Council

Judicial branch of the government of Svalbard 

Court system of Svalbard
 Supreme Court of Svalbard

Foreign relations of Svalbard 

Foreign relations of Svalbard
 Diplomatic missions in Svalbard
 Diplomatic missions of Svalbard

International organization membership 
none

Law and order in Svalbard 

Law of Svalbard
 Cannabis in Svalbard
 Constitution of Svalbard
 Crime in Svalbard
 Human rights in Svalbard
 LGBT rights in Svalbard
 Freedom of religion in Svalbard
 Law enforcement in Svalbard

Military of Svalbard 

Svalbard is a designated demilitarized zone.

Local government in Svalbard 

Local government in Svalbard

History of Svalbard 

History of Svalbard
 Timeline of the history of Svalbard
 Military history of Svalbard

Culture of Svalbard 

 Cuisine of Svalbard
 Languages of Svalbard
 National symbols of Svalbard
 Coat of arms of Svalbard
 Flag of Svalbard
 World Heritage Sites in Svalbard: None

Economy and infrastructure of Svalbard 

Economy of Svalbard
 Economic rank, by nominal GDP (2007):
 Agriculture in Svalbard
 Banking in Svalbard
 National Bank of Svalbard
 Communications in Svalbard
 Internet in Svalbard
 Companies of Svalbard
Currency of Svalbard: Krone
ISO 4217: NOK
 Energy in Svalbard
 Energy policy of Svalbard
 Oil industry in Svalbard
 Mining in Svalbard
 Svalbard Stock Exchange
 Tourism in Svalbard
 Transport in Svalbard
 Airports in Svalbard

Education in Svalbard 

Education in Svalbard

See also 

Svalbard
Index of Svalbard-related articles
List of international rankings
Outline of Europe
Outline of geography
Outline of Norway

References

External links 

 Governor of Svalbard (Sysselmannen) – Official site
 Norwegian Polar Institute: Svalbard.
 Norwegian Polar Institute Place Names of Svalbard Database (searchable database with name origins and map)
 Norwegian Ministry of Justice and the Police: Report to the Storting (1999–2000) on Svalbard – extensive report on political, administrative, economical and scientific matters relating to Svalbard
 Svalbard Science Forum SSF - Information for and about research in Svalbard
 Polar Marine Geosurvey: 
 A Geographical-Historical Outline of Svalbard
 Outline of the Physical Geography and Geology of Svalbard by Ólafur Ingólfsson
 
 Svalbard on the CIA World Factbook
 The Svalbard Pages
 Photos from Svalbard
 ) List of glaciers with areas]

Svalbard
 1